Bánh cốm is a Vietnamese dessert made from rice and mung bean. It is made by wrapping pounded and then green-coloured glutinous rice around sugary green-bean paste.

See also
 List of desserts

References

Vietnamese desserts
Bánh
Rice cakes